Ranbir Kapoor (born 1982) is an Indian actor who works in the Hindi film industry. He has received six Filmfare Awards, six International Indian Film Academy Awards, five Screen Awards, ten Stardust Awards and seven Zee Cine Awards. In addition to film awards, Kapoor has topped lists like People magazine's "Sexiest Man Alive" in India and Filmfare's poll of the "Most Stylish Young Actor". He is also one of the recipients of the "People of the Year" award by the Limca Book of Records.

Born to actors Rishi Kapoor and Neetu Singh, Kapoor began his career by assisting director Sanjay Leela Bhansali on the film Black (2005), and later made his acting debut with the director's 2007 tragic romance Saawariya for which he won the Filmfare Award for Best Male Debut. Kapoor later earned critical praise for his performances in Wake Up Sid, Ajab Prem Ki Ghazab Kahani, and Rocket Singh: Salesman of the Year in 2009. These performances earned him the Filmfare Award for Best Actor (Critics). He was later recognized for his role as an active member of a political family in the political thriller Raajneeti (2010), which also earned him Best Actor nominations at various award ceremonies.

In 2012, Kapoor received the Filmfare Award for Best Actor and the Filmfare Award for Best Actor (Critics) for his performance in the musical romantic drama Rockstar, and his second Filmfare Award for Best Actor for his portrayal of a deaf-mute man in Barfi! (2012), which also emerged as a commercial success. The romantic comedy-drama Yeh Jawaani Hai Deewani (2013) established him as one of the leading contemporary actors of Hindi cinema and earned him a nomination for the Filmfare Award for Best Actor. Kapoor's next set of films received mixed critical and commercial response, but his performances in the romantic dramas Tamasha (2015) and Ae Dil Hai Mushkil (2016) which was the only commercial success during this phase, fetched him critical acclaim and Best Actor nominations at several award ceremonies. In 2018, Kapoor portrayed Sanjay Dutt in Rajkumar Hirani's biopic Sanju, which is his biggest commercial success till date and one of the highest-grossing Indian films of all time, for which he won another Filmfare Award for Best Actor.

Asian Film Awards
The Asian Film Awards are presented annually by the Hong Kong International Film Festival Society to members of Asian cinema. Kapoor has received one nomination.

BIG Star Entertainment Awards
The BIG Star Entertainment Awards is an annual event organised by the Reliance Broadcast Network. Kapoor has received nine awards from nine nominations.

CNN-IBN Indian of the Year
The CNN-IBN Indian of the Year is an award presented annually by CNN-IBN since 2006 to Indians who have been judged to have helped strengthen society and build Brand India during the year. Kapoor has received three awards.

Filmfare Awards
The Filmfare Awards are presented annually by The Times Group for excellence of cinematic achievements in Hindi cinema. Kapoor has received six awards from thirteen nominations.

Indian Film Festival Melbourne

International Indian Film Academy Awards
The International Indian Film Academy Awards (shortened as IIFA) is annual international event organised by the Wizcraft International Entertainment Pvt. Ltd. to honour excellence in the Hindi cinema. Kapoor has won six awards from thirteen nominations.

NDV Indian of the Year
The NDTV Indian of the Year is an annual award presented by NDTV. Kapoor has won two awards.

Star Screen Awards
The Star Screen Awards is a yearly ceremony honouring professional excellence in the Hindi language film industry. Kapoor has won three awards from fifteen nominations.

Star Guild Awards
The Star Guild Awards (previously known as the Apsara Film & Television Producers Guild Awards) are presented by the Apsara Producers Guild to honour and recognise the professional excellence of their peers. Kapoor has received four awards from seven nominations.

Stardust Awards
Winner
 2008 – Superstar of Tomorrow – Male for Saawariya
 2010 – Superstar of Tomorrow – Male for Wake Up Sid & Ajab Prem Ki Ghazab Kahani
2009 – Star of the Year – Male for Bachna Ae Haseeno
 2011 – Best Actor – Drama for Raajneeti
 2011 – Star of the Year – Male for Raajneeti
 2012 – Best Actor – Drama for Rockstar
 2012 – Star of the Year – Male for Rockstar
 2013 – Best Actor – Drama for Barfi!
 2013 – Star of the Year – Male for Barfi!
 2015 – Best Actor of the Year (Male) for Tamasha

Zee Cine Awards
Winner
 2008 – Best Male Debut for Saawariya
 2011 – Best International Icon – Male
 2012 – Best Actor – Male for Rockstar
 2013 – Best Actor (Critics) for Barfi!
 2012 – Best International Icon – Male
 2019 – Best Actor – Male for Sanju

People's Choice Awards
Won
 2012 – Favorite Movie Youth Icon
 2012 – Favorite Movie Actor – Male for Rockstar

Other awards and recognitions

See also
 List of accolades received by Barfi!

References

Lists of awards received by Indian actor